Conostegia is a genus of flowering plants belonging to the family Melastomataceae.

Its native range is Southern and Northern America.

Species:

Conostegia allenii 
Conostegia apiculata 
Conostegia arborea 
Conostegia attenuata 
Conostegia balbisiana 
Conostegia bigibbosa 
Conostegia bracteata 
Conostegia brenesiana 
Conostegia brenesii 
Conostegia caelestis 
Conostegia calocoma 
Conostegia centronioides 
Conostegia centrosperma 
Conostegia chiriquensis 
Conostegia cinnamomea 
Conostegia colliculosa 
Conostegia consimilis 
Conostegia cuatrecasasii 
Conostegia dentata 
Conostegia dissitiflora 
Conostegia dissitinervia 
Conostegia ecuadorensis 
Conostegia extinctoria 
Conostegia foreroi 
Conostegia fraterna 
Conostegia friedmaniorum 
Conostegia fulvostellata 
Conostegia galdamesiae 
Conostegia grayumii 
Conostegia hammelii 
Conostegia henripittieri 
Conostegia hirtella 
Conostegia icosandra 
Conostegia incurva 
Conostegia inusitata 
Conostegia iteophylla 
Conostegia jaliscana 
Conostegia jefensis 
Conostegia lancifolia 
Conostegia lasiopoda 
Conostegia lindenii 
Conostegia macrantha 
Conostegia micrantha 
Conostegia montana 
Conostegia monteleagreana 
Conostegia muriculata 
Conostegia myriasporoides 
Conostegia oerstediana 
Conostegia oligocephala 
Conostegia ombrophila 
Conostegia ortiziae 
Conostegia osaensis 
Conostegia papillopetala 
Conostegia peltata 
Conostegia pendula 
Conostegia pittieri 
Conostegia plumosa 
Conostegia polyandra 
Conostegia povedae 
Conostegia procera 
Conostegia pyxidata 
Conostegia rhodopetala 
Conostegia rubiginosa 
Conostegia rufescens 
Conostegia schlimii 
Conostegia setifera 
Conostegia setosa 
Conostegia shattuckii 
Conostegia speciosa 
Conostegia subcrustulata 
Conostegia subpeltata 
Conostegia superba 
Conostegia tenuifolia 
Conostegia trichosantha 
Conostegia volcanalis 
Conostegia vulcanicola 
Conostegia xalapensis

References

Melastomataceae
Melastomataceae genera